Samu Torsti (born September 5, 1991 in Vaasa, Finland) is an alpine skier from Finland.

World Cup results

Season standings

Standings through 3 Mar 2018.

World Championship results

References

1991 births
Living people
Olympic alpine skiers of Finland
Alpine skiers at the 2014 Winter Olympics
Alpine skiers at the 2018 Winter Olympics
Alpine skiers at the 2022 Winter Olympics
Finnish male alpine skiers
Sportspeople from Vaasa
21st-century Finnish people